URB754 was originally reported by Piomelli et al. to be a potent, noncompetitive inhibitor of monoacylglycerol lipase (MGL). However, recent studies have shown that URB754 failed to inhibit recombinant MGL, and brain FAAH activity was also resistant to URB754.  In a later study by Piomelli et al., the MGL-inhibitory activity attributed to URB754 is in fact due to a chemical impurity present in the commercial sample, identified as bis(methylthio)mercurane.

References

Benzoxazines
Lactones